No. 1460 (Fighter) Flight was formed at RAF Acklington on 15 December 1941, equipped with Turbinlite Douglas Boston and Douglas Havoc aircraft. The flight became operational in May 1942 and made its first and only contact with the enemy in June of that year. On operations they cooperated first with the Hawker Hurricanes of 43 Squadron and later with those of 1 Squadron. The flight was replaced with 539 Squadron on 2 September 1942 but officially disbanded as late as 23 January 1943.

539 Squadron, which had taken over the men and machines, carried on flying the Turbinlite Bostons and Havocs until the system was abandoned on 25 January 1943, when Turbinlite squadrons were, due to lack of success on their part and the rapid development of AI radar, thought to be superfluous.

Aircraft operated

Flight bases

Commanding officers

References
Notes

Bibliography

 Delve, Ken. The Source Book of the RAF. Shrewsbury, Shropshire, UK: Airlife Publishing, 1994. .
 Halley, James J. The Squadrons of the Royal Air Force & Commonwealth 1918-1988. Tonbridge, Kent, UK: Air Britain (Historians) Ltd., 1988. .
 Jefford, C.G. RAF Squadrons, a Comprehensive record of the Movement and Equipment of all RAF Squadrons and their Antecedents since 1912. Shrewsbury, Shropshire, UK: Airlife Publishing, 1988 (second edition 2001). .
 Lake, Alan. Flying Units of the RAF. Shrewsbury, Shropshire, UK: Airlife Publishing, 1999. .
 Rawlings, John D.R. Fighter Squadrons of the RAF and their Aircraft. London: Macdonald & Jane's (Publishers) Ltd., 1969 (2nd edition 1976, reprinted 1978). .
 Sturtivant, Ray, ISO and John Hamlin. RAF Flying Training And Support Units since 1912. Tonbridge, Kent, UK: Air-Britain (Historians) Ltd., 2007. .

External links
 Aircraft and Markings of no. 511-598 sqn, amongst them 539 sqn, the successor of 1460 flt.

1460 Flight
Military units and formations established in 1941